Qafa e Morinës is a mountain pass through the Albanian mountains along the border between Albania and Kosovo. There is a border crossing point here between the two countries.

References 

Mountain passes of Albania
Albania–Kosovo border crossings